Julie Kumin Mota (born 1978) is a writer, poet and artist from Papua New Guinea. Her artwork is held in the permanent collections of the Fine Arts Museums of San Francisco and the De Young Museum, also in San Francisco.

Life 
Mota was born in Tufi, Oro Province and studied theatre arts at the University of Papua New Guinea. She began working as an artist and writer in 1999.

Publications 

Cultural Refugees – An Anthology of Poems, CreateSpace, 2016
Discovering Democracy - A guide for forming youth groups in Papua New Guinea , Live & Learn Environmental Education, 2012

References

Living people
1978 births
People from Oro Province
University of Papua New Guinea alumni
Papua New Guinean artists
Papua New Guinean writers
Papua New Guinean women writers